Banauli Vidyapati Dih is a historical place related to the great Maithili poet Vidyapati. It is located at Banauli village of Mahottari district in Madhesh Pradesh of Mithila region in Nepal.   

It is 3.8 miles or 6.116 kilometres South-West from the historical, cultural and religious city of Janakpur Dham in Nepal. It is believed that when the Mughal emperor arrested the King Sivasimha of Mithila, then the King said to his friend and priest Vidyapati to flew his wife Lakhima Devi into the neighbouring country Nepal at his friends kingdom Banauli Raj. Dronwara Puraditya was the King of Banauli Raj Kingdom. Vidyapati and the queen Lakhima Devi took asylum at  the court of Dronwara Puraditya . It is said that they lived here for twelve years. Vidyapati wrote many books there. The Government of Madhesh Pradesh declared it as a tourist centre.

History 
The presence of the place is recorded in the poem “Trishit” of Kali Kant Jha. There is a library called as Vidyapati Memorial Library near the site in the Banauli village of Nepal. There is a very big pond named as Lakshmi Sagar near the site. The site has been also recorded as the site of the capital of  King Puraditya of Dronwara Dynasty Kingdom in the ancient Mithila. Dronwara Puraditya was the friend of another great Emperor King Sivasimha of Oiniwar dynasty in Mithila. According to the poem "Trishit" the Maithili poet Vidyapati wrote his books Bhagavat, Durga Bhakti and Tarangini here. According to a journal article "CREDIT SYSTEM IN MITHILA" at JSTOR, Vidyapati wrote his famous book Likhanavali at the court of King Dronwara Puraditya in Raj Banauli around Lakshman Samvat 299 ( 1418 AD ). Likhanavali is an important work of Vidyapati for the study of administrative, cultural and socio-economic life of early 15th century in Mithila.

References 

Mithila
Ashramas
Maithili language
Indian philosophy
Mahottari District